Tripp County is a county in the U.S. state of South Dakota. As of the 2020 census, the population was 5,624. Its county seat is Winner. The county was created in 1873, and was organized in 1909. It is named for lawyer, judge, and diplomat Bartlett Tripp.

Geography
Tripp County lies on the south line of South Dakota. Its south boundary is the Nebraska state line, while its north boundary is the meandering White River. The Keya Paha River flows east-southeasterly through the lower part of the county. The county terrain is composed of rolling hills carved by gullies and drainages. The county terrain generally slopes to the south and east, although its upper portion drops northward into the White River valley. The county's highest point is on the lower part of its west boundary line, at 2,552' (778m) ASL.

Major highways

  U.S. Highway 18
  U.S. Highway 183
  South Dakota Highway 44
  South Dakota Highway 49
  South Dakota Highway 53

Adjacent counties

 Lyman County - north
 Gregory County - east
 Keya Paha County, Nebraska - south
 Cherry County, Nebraska - southwest
 Todd County - west
 Mellette County - northwest

Protected areas
 Beaulieu Lake State Game Production Area
 Brown State Game Production Area
 Covey Dam State Game Production Area
 Dog Ear Lake State Game Production Area
 George & Katherine Mann State Game Production Area
 Ideal Wetland State Game Production Area
 King Dam State Game Production Area
 Little Dog Ear Lake State Game Production Area
 McLaughlin State Game Production Area
 Rahm Lake State Game Production Area
 Roosevelt Lake State Game Production Area
 Snow Dam State Game Production Area

Lakes
 Roosevelt Lake

Demographics

2000 census
As of the 2000 United States Census, there were 6,430 people, 2,550 households, and 1,721 families in the county. The population density was 4 people per square mile (2/km2). There were 3,036 housing units at an average density of 2 per square mile (1/km2). The racial makeup of the county was 87.48% White, 0.03% Black or African American, 11.20% Native American, 0.06% Asian, 0.08% from other races, and 1.15% from two or more races. 0.86% of the population were Hispanic or Latino of any race.

There were 2,550 households, out of which 30.40% had children under the age of 18 living with them, 56.90% were married couples living together, 6.60% had a female householder with no husband present, and 32.50% were non-families. 29.60% of all households were made up of individuals, and 15.70% had someone living alone who was 65 years of age or older.  The average household size was 2.48 and the average family size was 3.08.

The county population contained 27.70% under the age of 18, 6.20% from 18 to 24, 24.40% from 25 to 44, 21.90% from 45 to 64, and 19.70% who were 65 years of age or older. The median age was 40 years. For every 100 females there were 97.40 males. For every 100 females age 18 and over, there were 94.70 males.

The median income for a household in the county was $28,333, and the median income for a family was $36,219. Males had a median income of $22,588 versus $18,070 for females. The per capita income for the county was $13,776. About 15.90% of families and 19.90% of the population were below the poverty line, including 20.70% of those under age 18 and 17.60% of those age 65 or over.

2010 census
As of the 2010 United States Census, there were 5,644 people, 2,419 households, and 1,509 families in the county. The racial makeup of the county was 83.1% white, 14.0% American Indian, 0.2% Asian, 0.1% black or African American, 0.2% from other races, and 2.4% from two or more races. Those of Hispanic or Latino origin made up 1.1% of the population. In terms of ancestry, 46.8% were German, 10.8% were Irish, 7.7% were Czech, 6.2% were Dutch, and 4.0% were American.

Of the 2,419 households, 26.9% had children under the age of 18 living with them, 50.4% were married couples living together, 8.4% had a female householder with no husband present, 37.6% were non-families, and 34.6% of all households were made up of individuals. The average household size was 2.28 and the average family size was 2.93. The median age was 45.3 years.

The median income for a household in the county was $40,221 and the median income for a family was $49,570. Males had a median income of $35,238 versus $25,323 for females. The per capita income for the county was $21,192. About 12.1% of families and 16.5% of the population were below the poverty line, including 27.4% of those under age 18 and 10.3% of those age 65 or over.

Communities

City
 Colome
 Winner (county seat)

Town
New Witten (called "Witten" by US Post Office)

Census-designated place
Hamill (Population:14)
Ideal (Population:86)

Unincorporated communities

 Carter 
 Clearfield  
 Jordan Junction 
 Keyapaha 
 Millboro 
 Wewela

Townships

Banner
Beaver Creek
Black
Brunson
Bull Creek
Carter
Colome
Condon
Curlew
Dog Ear
Elliston
Greenwood
Holsclaw
Huggins
Ideal
Irwin
Jordan
Keyapaha
King
Lake
Lamro
Lincoln
Lone Star
Lone Tree
McNeely
Millboro
Pahapesto
Plainview
Pleasant Valley
Pleasant View
Progressive
Rames
Rosedale
Roseland
Star Prairie
Star Valley
Stewart
Sully
Taylor
Valley
Weave
Willow Creek
Wilson
Witten
Wortman
Wright

Unorganized territory
The county contains one area of unorganized territory: Gassman.

Politics
Tripp County voters have traditionally voted Republican. In no national election since 1964 has the county selected the Democratic Party candidate (as of 2020). The Democratic Party has not obtained forty percent of the county's vote since Jimmy Carter in 1976.

See also
 National Register of Historic Places listings in Tripp County, South Dakota

References

 
1909 establishments in South Dakota
Populated places established in 1909